Don't Look Back is a 1996 American made-for-HBO thriller film directed by Geoff Murphy and starring Eric Stoltz, John Corbett, Josh Hamilton, and Billy Bob Thornton, who also co-wrote the screenplay.

Synopsis 
Jesse Parish, a heroin addict living in Los Angeles, steals a suitcase full of drug money and immediately finds himself on the run from its former owners. Jesse flees home to Galveston, Texas, to his childhood friends, and into their lives he brings not only his internal demon of addiction, but the evil men who want their drug money back.

Main cast
 Eric Stoltz as Jesse Parish
 John Corbett as Morgan
 Josh Hamilton as Steve
 Ja'net Dubois as Mrs. Lawson
 Billy Bob Thornton as Marshall
 Annabeth Gish as Michelle
 Amanda Plummer as Bridget
 Dwight Yoakam as Skipper
 Henry Brown as Doctor
 Troy Curvey Jr. as Cab Driver

References

External links
 

1996 crime thriller films
1996 films
Films set in Texas
Films shot in Houston
Films shot in Texas
HBO Films films
1996 television films
Films directed by Geoff Murphy
American crime thriller films
1990s English-language films
1990s American films